The Oro-Medonte 77's were a Junior ice hockey team based out of Oro-Medonte, Ontario, Canada.  Their arena was in the community of Guthrie, Ontario.  They played in the Greater Metro Junior 'A' Hockey League.

History
In April 2008, it was announced that Oro-Medonte had received its first junior hockey club since 1992.  In May it was announced that the club would be known as the Oro-Medonte 77's.  The name pays homage to Oro's long hockey history, and the team's predecessor the Oro 77's who participated in the Georgian Bay Junior C Hockey League from 1977 until 1992. 

On September 15, 2008, the Oro-Medonte 77's played their first ever GMHL game, on the road, in Richmond Hill against the Ontario Lightning Rams.  Oro emerged victorious, winning 8-6.

After three seasons in the GMHL, in the Summer of 2011, the 77's ceased operation.

Season-by-Season Standings

Playoffs 
2009 Lost division quarter-final
Nipissing Alouettes defeated Oro-Medonte 77's 3-games-to-none in division quarter-final
2010 Lost last minute qualifier
Toronto Canada Moose defeated Oro-Medonte 77's 6-4 in last minute qualifier
2011 Lost quarter-final
Oro-Medonte 77's defeated Algoma Avalanche 2-games-to-none in qualifier
South Muskoka Shield defeated Oro-Medonte 77's 3-games-to-none in quarter-final

External links
Oro-Medonte 77's

Ice hockey teams in Ontario